Rim Kin (8 November 1911–28 January 1959) was a Cambodian writer, and one of the founders of Cambodian modern literature. He was the author of Sophat (1938), the first published novel in Cambodia to be written in prose rather than the customary verse form. It became a 1964 movie of the same name. In 1935, the weekly Cambodian newspaper Ratri Thnai Saur was founded and it hosted the first modern serial stories of Kin. From 1955 through 1957, Kin was the first president of the Khmer Writers' Association.

Partial works
 1938, Sophat (រឿងសូផាត) 
 1943, Samapheavi (សមាភាវី)

References

1911 births
1959 deaths
Cambodian male writers
20th-century novelists
Cambodian novelists
Male novelists
20th-century male writers
20th-century Cambodian writers